Zenia Stampe Lyngbo (born 30 March 1979 in Roskilde) is a Danish politician, who is a member of the Folketing for the Social Liberal Party. She was elected into parliament at the 2011 Danish general election.

Background 
Stampe graduated from Copenhagen University with an MSc in political science in 2008. She worked in the Danish Business Authority (Danish: erhvervs- og bygge styrelsen) from 2010 to 2011, before being elected to represent the Zealand constituency. Her policy positions include effective climate action, strong criticism of tough immigration policies, and pro European and international co-operation. She has blogged for the Danish newspaper Politiken, and has been the target of abusive comments on social media.

Political career
Stampe was first elected to parliament in the 2011 election, and was reelected in 2015, 2019, and 2022.

References

External links 
 Biography on the website of the Danish Parliament (Folketinget)

1979 births
Living people
People from Roskilde
Danish Social Liberal Party politicians
Women members of the Folketing
21st-century Danish women politicians
Members of the Folketing 2011–2015
Members of the Folketing 2015–2019
Members of the Folketing 2019–2022
Members of the Folketing 2022–2026